Sarah Wheelock is an American lawyer and jurist serving as a judge of the Minnesota Court of Appeals. She was appointed to the court by Governor Tim Walz on December 1, 2021, and assumed office on January 10, 2022.

Education 
Wheelock earned a Bachelor of Arts degree from the University of Iowa and a Juris Doctor from the University of Iowa College of Law.

Career 
Prior to her appointment as a judge, Wheelock served as legal counsel for the Shakopee Mdewakanton Sioux Community in Prior Lake, Minnesota. She also worked an appellate judge of the White Earth Band of Chippewa Court of Appeals and an adjunct professor at the Hamline University School of Law. A member of Meskwaki Nation, Wheelock is the first Native American judge to sit on the Minnesota Court of Appeals.

References 

Living people
Minnesota lawyers
University of Iowa alumni
University of Iowa College of Law alumni
Hamline University faculty
Native American lawyers
Year of birth missing (living people)